Bride and Gloom may refer to:

 "Bride and Gloom" (Charmed), an episode of the TV series Charmed
 Bride and Gloom (film), a 1918 American short comedy film